ERG11 or Sterol 14-demethylase is a fungal cytochrome P450 enzyme originally from Saccharomyces cerevisiae, belongs to family CYP51, with the CYP Symbol CYP51F1. ERG11 catalyzes the C14-demethylation of lanosterol to 4,4'-dimethyl cholesta-8,14,24-triene-3-beta-ol which is the first step of biosynthesis of the zymosterol, zymosterol will be further converted into Ergosterol.

References 

Cytochrome P450
EC 1.14.14
Saccharomyces cerevisiae genes